Ángeles Moreno Bau (born 1968) is a Spanish diplomat who has been serving as the 14th and current Secretary of State for Foreign Affairs in the government of Prime Minister Pedro Sánchez since 2021. Previously, she served as the 12th Secretary of State for International Cooperation from 2020 to 2021.

Early life and education
Born in Madrid in 1968, Moreno earned a licentiate degree in Law from the Complutense University of Madrid (UCM). She also studied sociology at The American University in Cairo and international law at the University of Vienna.

Career
Having joined the diplomatic corps in 1994, Moreno was destined to Mexico, Sierra Leone, Cairo, Panama and Moscow. She was appointed as Under-Secretary for Foreign Affairs, the European Union and Cooperation in July 2018.

Following the formation of a new government in January 2020 and the appointment of Arancha González Laya as new foreign minister, Moreno was entrusted a Secretariat of State solely responsible for international cooperation, removed from the General State Administration since 2011. She took office on 7 February 2020.

In July 2021, the new Foreign Minister, José Manuel Albares, appointed her as the 14th Secretary of State for Foreign Affairs.

Other activities
 Barcelona Institute for Global Health (ISGlobal), Member of the Board of Trustees

References 

Secretaries of State of Spain
Complutense University of Madrid alumni
1968 births
Spanish women diplomats
Living people